Robert Cook (3 October 1905 – 1963) was a British wrestler. He competed in the men's freestyle welterweight category at the 1928 Summer Olympics, were he finished in fifth place. He lost on points to eventual Silver medal winner Lloyd Appleton (U.S.A) in the opening round, then went on to meet Maurice Letchford (Canada) in the bronze medal round, again losing on points.

References

External links
 

1905 births
1963 deaths
British male sport wrestlers
Olympic wrestlers of Great Britain
Wrestlers at the 1928 Summer Olympics
People from the London Borough of Islington
Date of death missing